The Prix du Premier Roman (First Novel Prize) is a French literary prize awarded to an unpublished novelist between the ages of 18 to 30. The monetary reward is 3,000 Euros.

The prize was first awarded in 1977. Starting with 1998 a separate award is given to the best first novel by a foreign writer. The jury is made out of literary critics and the current president of the jury is the French historian and critic Joël Schmidt.

Winners of Prix du Premier Roman 

1977: Michel Arrivé, Les remembrances du vieillard idiot, (Flammarion) 
1978: 
1979: Marco Koskas, Balace Bounel
1980: Dan Franck, Les Calendes grecques, Calmann-Lévy
1981: Annick Geille, Portrait d'un amour coupable, Éditions Grasset
1982: Bruno Racine, Le Gouverneur de Morée, Grasset
1983: Elvire Murail, Escalier C, S. Messinger
1984: Jean-Philippe Arrou-Vignod, Le Rideau sur la nuit, Gallimard
1985: 
1986: Alexandre Jardin, Bille en tête, Gallimard
1987: Jean-François Merle, Cale sèche, (Arléa)
1988: Nadine Diamant, Désordres, (Flammarion)
1989: Louis-Jacques Liandier, Comme un voleur dans la nuit
1990: Caroline Tiné, L'immeuble, Albin Michel
1991: Patrick Séry, Le Maître et le scorpion, Flammarion
1992: Isabelle Jarry, L'Homme de la passerelle, Mercure de France
1993: Christophe Bataille, Annam, Arléa
1994: Jean-François Kervéan, La Folie du moment, Calmann-Lévy
1995: Sophie Fontanel, Sacré Paul, NiL Éditions
1996: Pascale Roze, Le Chasseur Zéro, Albin Michel
1997: Raymond Bozier, Lieu-dit, Calmann-Lévy
1998: Christine Chaufour Verheyen, Rive dangeureuse, Fayard
1999: Boualem Sansal, Le Serment des barbares, Gallimard
2000: Bruno Gibert, Claude (Fayard)
2001: Claire Béchet, Entre parenthèses, Calmann-Lévy
2002: Christophe Dufossé, L'Heure de la sortie, Albin Michel
2003: Yasmina Trabouli, for Les Enfants de la place, Mercure de France
2004: Caroline Sers, for Tombent les avions, 
2005: Hédi Kaddour, for Waltenberg, Gallimard
2006: Max Monnehay, for Corpus Christine, Albin Michel
2007: Ingrid Thobois, for Le Roi d'Afghanistan ne nous a pas mariés, Éditions Phébus
2008: Thierry Dancourt, for Hôtel de Lausanne, Éditions de La Table Ronde
2009: Jocelyn Bonnerave, for Nouveaux indiens, Éditions du Seuil
2010: Victor Cohen Hadria, for Les trois saisons de la rage
2011: Marien Defalvard, for Du temps qu'on existait, Grasset
2012: , for L'Assassin à la pomme verte, Serge Safran
2013: Clément Bénech, for L'Été slovène, Flammarion
2014: , for Vera, Mercure de France
2015: Didier Castino, for Après le silence, Liana Levi
2016: Gaël Faye, for Petit Pays, Grasset
2017: Jean-Baptiste Andrea, for Ma reine, L'Iconoclaste
2018: Clélia Renucci, for Concours pour le Paradis, Albin Michel
2019: Géraldine Dalban-Moreynas, for On ne meurt pas d'amour, Plon
2020: Ketty Rouf, for On ne touche pas, Albin Michel
2021: Maud Ventura, for "Mon mari", L'iconoclaste
2022: Maria Larrea, for "Les gens de Bilbao naissent où ils veulent", Grasset

Winners of Prix du Premier Roman Etranger 

 1998: Martin Suter, Small World (Switzerland)
 1999: Boualem Sansal, Le Serment des barbares (Algeria)
 2000: Jim Fergus, One Thousand White Women: The Journals of May Dodd (United States)
 2001: Keith Ridgway, The Long Falling (Ireland)
 2002: Gwen Edelman, War Story (United States)
 2003: Lavinia Greenlaw, Mary George of Allnorthover (United Kingdom)
 2004: Inderjit Badhwar, The Chamber of Perfumes (India)
 2005: Samina Ali, Madras on Rainy Days (India)
 2006: Benjamin Kunkel, Indecision (United States)
 2007: Dinaw Mengestu, The Beautiful Things That Heaven Bears (United States)
 2008: James Cañón, Tales from the Town of Widows (Colombia)
 2009: Chloe Aridjis, Book of Clouds (United States)
 2010: Amanda Smyth, Black Rock (Ireland)
 2011: Nic Pizzolatto, Galveston: A Novel (United States)
 2012: Amy Waldman, The Submission (United States)
 2013: Patrick McGuinness, The Last Hundred Days (United Kingdom)
 2014: Rene Denfeld, The Enchanted: A Novel (United States)
 2015: (ex-æquo) Vanessa Barbara, Noites de alface (Brazil)
 2015: (ex-æquo) Maja Haderlap, Angel of Oblivion (Austria)
 2016: Davide Enia, On Earth as It Is in Heaven: A Novel (Italy)
 2017: Katharina Winkler, Blue Jewellery (Germany)
 2018: Shih-Li Kow, The Sum of Our Follies (Malaysia)
 2019: Sana Krasikov, The Patriots (United States)
 2020: Olja Savičević, Adios Cow Boy (Croatia)
 2021: Daniel Loedel, Hadès, Argentine (United States)
 2022: Jarred McGinnis, The Coward (United States)

References 

French fiction awards
First book awards
Awards established in 1977